Ko is a peak in the southern part of Khabarovsk Krai near the border of Primorsky Krai.

It sits at 2,003 m above sea level. It is the second highest point of the Sikhote-Alin Mountains.The name of the mountain is from the udege language meaning witch or sorcoress.

Notes

Mountains of Khabarovsk Krai
Sikhote-Alin